Spring Garden Township is a township in York County, Pennsylvania, United States. The population was 13,683 at the 2020 census. The township is adjacent to the city of York.

History
The historic Francis Farquhar house, known as The Nook, was listed on the National Register of Historic Places in 1982.

Geography

Economy
Spring Garden Township is headquarters to York International, a Johnson Controls Company and one of the largest suppliers of HVAC systems in the United States. On February 2, 1998, a massive explosion occurred at the York International plant. A spark had set off a leak in the nearby propane storage house. The blast was felt up to 25 miles away, and blew out windows nearby as well as knocking down doors. About 20 people were injured in the blast but only one person was killed, as the explosion occurred during a shift change.

Demographics
As of the census of 2020, there were 13,683 people residing in the township. The racial makeup of the township was 84.0% white, 6.5% black or African American, 2.7% Asian, 1.2% Native American, and 5.6% from other races. 5.4% of the population were Hispanic or Latino of any race.

As of the census of 2010, there were 12,578 people, 4,302 households, and 3,062 families residing in the township. The racial makeup of the township was 91.8% White, 3.8% African American, 0.2% Native American, 1.7% Asian, 0.0% Pacific Islander, 1.0% from other races, and 1.5% from two or more races. Hispanic or Latino of any race were 3.5% of the population.

There were 4,302 households, out of which 28.5% had children under the age of 18 living with them, 57.6% were married couples living together, 10.1% had a female householder with no husband present, and 28.8% were non-families. 22.9% of all households were made up of individuals, and 9.4% had someone living alone who was 65 years of age or older.  The average household size was 2.45 and the average family size was 2.88.

In the township the population was spread out, with 18.9% under the age of 18, 18.3% from 18 to 24, 20.1% from 25 to 44, 26.0% from 45 to 64, and 16.7% who were 65 years of age or older.  The median age was 38.8 years. For every 100 females there were 94.1 males.  Among those age 18 and over, for every 100 females there were 91.8 males.

The median income for a household in the township was $51,914, and the median income for a family was $62,982. Males had a median income of $46,478 versus $36,040 for females. The per capita income for the township was $27,334.  About 10.1% of families and 13.8% of the population were below the poverty line, including 19.2% of those under age 18 and 9.5% of those age 65 or over.

York Area United Fire and Rescue

In June 2004, the Springettsbury Township supervisors and the Spring Garden Township commissioners formed an ad hoc committee to consider a combined fire service.  A Joint Fire Service (JFS) committee first met in May 2005 to develop a framework. In 2006, a consulting firm was hired to provide a comprehensive plan. The plan, whose development received significant assistance from the Pennsylvania Department of Community and Economic Development, was approved by the JFS committee in 2007. Both townships approved a charter amendment for creation of a fire commission to govern the new department, composed of seven commissioners drawn from the two townships.  The first meeting of the York Area United Fire and Rescue Commission was held in September 2007, and a formal consolidation took place on May 5, 2008, establishing York County Company 89. In 2009, the department began selling and removing from service its excessive apparatus and replacing it with new, such as three pumpers with two 2010 models. In April 2010, the York Area United Fire and Rescue Commission and the International Association of Fire Fighters, Local 2377, signed the first joint contract for the department.

Notable residents
Scott Wagner, Pennsylvania State Senator

References

Populated places established in 1750
Townships in York County, Pennsylvania